The 2015 Major League Baseball postseason was the playoff tournament of Major League Baseball for the 2015 season. The winners of the League Division Series would move on to the League Championship Series to determine the pennant winners that face each other in the World Series.

In the American League, the Kansas City Royals made their second straight appearance, the New York Yankees returned for the first time since 2012, the Texas Rangers returned for the fourth time in six years, the Houston Astros made their first postseason appearance as a member of the American League, and the Toronto Blue Jays made their first postseason appearance since 1993.

In the National League, the St. Louis Cardinals made their fifth straight postseason appearance, the Los Angeles Dodgers and Pittsburgh Pirates made their third straight appearances, the Chicago Cubs returned for the first time since 2008, and the New York Mets made their first appearance since 2006.

The postseason began on October 6, and ended on November 1, with the Royals defeating the Mets in five games in the 2015 World Series. It was the first title in 30 years for the Royals, as well as the most recent postseason appearance by the franchise to date.

Playoff seeds
The following teams qualified for the postseason:

American League
 Kansas City Royals - 95–67, Clinched AL Central
 Toronto Blue Jays - 93–69, Clinched AL East
 Texas Rangers - 90–72, Clinched AL West
 New York Yankees - 87–75
 Houston Astros - 86–76

National League
 St. Louis Cardinals - 100–62, Clinched NL Central
 Los Angeles Dodgers - 92–70, Clinched NL West
 New York Mets - 90–72, Clinched NL East
 Pittsburgh Pirates - 98–64
 Chicago Cubs - 97–65

Playoff bracket

American League Wild Card

(4) New York Yankees vs. (5) Houston Astros 

This was the first postseason meeting between the Astros and Yankees, and was the first postseason appearance by the Astros since 2005. The Astros shut out the Yankees 3-0 to advance to the ALDS. Both teams would meet again in the ALCS in 2017,  2019, and 2022, all won by the Astros.

National League Wild Card

(4) Pittsburgh Pirates vs. (5) Chicago Cubs 

The Cubs shut out the Pirates 4-0 to advance to the NLDS. As of 2022, this is the last postseason appearance by the Pirates.

American League Division Series

(1) Kansas City Royals vs. (5) Houston Astros 

The Royals rallied from a 2-1 series deficit to defeat the Astros in five games and return to the ALCS for the second straight year.

Both teams split the first two games in Kansas City - the Astros stole Game 1 on the road, while the Royals rallied in the sixth and seventh innings of Game 2 to even the series headed to Houston. Dallas Keuchel and the Astros' bullpen helped the Astros prevail 4-2 in Game 3 to take a 2-1 series lead, and were one win away from returning to the LCS for the first time since 2005. However, their lead would not hold. In Game 4, the Astros held a 6-2 lead after seven innings and looked poised to close out the series. Then, the Royals offense took apart the Astros bullpen, as they scored five unanswered runs to regain the lead. Eric Hosmer hit a two-run home run to increase the Royals' lead in the top of the ninth, and then the Royals' bullpen closed out the game in the bottom of the inning. The Royals closed out the Astros with a convincing 7-2 victory thanks to a stellar pitching performance from Johnny Cueto, who was only two pitches away from pitching a perfect game.

The Astros would make their next postseason appearance in 2017, where they went on to win the World Series.

(2) Toronto Blue Jays vs. (3) Texas Rangers 

This was the first postseason meeting between the Rangers and Blue Jays. The Rangers went up 2-0 in the series, but the Blue Jays rallied to tie the series. The Blue Jays defeated the Rangers in Game 5 to return to the ALCS for the first time since 1993. This was the first playoff series win by the Blue Jays since the 1993 World Series. 

The Rangers stole the first two games in Toronto - they won by two runs in Game 1, and prevailed by two runs again in Game 2 after an ugly 14-inning affair. When the series shifted to Arlington, however, the Blue Jays would take Game 3 convincingly to avoid a sweep, and then took Game 4 by an 8-4 score to send the series back to Toronto. Game 5 of the series was notable for the events that transpired in the seventh inning - the Rangers made three consecutive errors, allowing the Blue Jays to tie the game at 3 runs each. Then José Bautista hit a game-sealing 3-run home run, and before running the bases, flipped his bat in celebration. Both benches cleared for a brief scuffle between both teams, but it was resolved shortly after. The Blue Jays closed out the series in the top of the ninth to advance.

Both teams would meet again in the ALDS the next year, which the Blue Jays won in a sweep.

National League Division Series

(1) St. Louis Cardinals vs. (5) Chicago Cubs 

This was the first postseason meeting in the history of the Cardinals-Cubs rivalry. The Cubs defeated the top-seeded Cardinals in four games to return to the NLCS for the first time since 2003.

John Lackey helped the Cardinals prevail in a shutout in Game 1. In Game 2, the Cubs jumped out to an early 6-1 lead and did not relinquish it, as the Cubs bullpen held the Cardinals' offense to just two more runs scored to even the series. Game 3 was an offensive duel which the Cubs won 8-6. The Cubs then took Game 4 by a 6-4 score to win their first playoff series at Wrigley Field.

(2) Los Angeles Dodgers vs. (3) New York Mets 

This was the third postseason meeting between the Dodgers and Mets, having split the first two meetings (Dodgers won 4–3 in the 1988 NLCS; Mets won 3–0 in the 2006 NLDS). The Mets defeated the Dodgers in five games to advance to the NLCS for the first time since 2006.

Jacob deGrom had a solid pitching performance in Game 1 as the Mets won 3-1. The Dodgers rallied with a 4-run seventh inning to even the series headed to Queens. Game 3 was an offensive duel which the Mets won 13-7 to take a 2-1 series lead. The Dodgers evened the series in Game 4 thanks to a stellar pitching performance from Clayton Kershaw, and were now headed back to Los Angeles for a series-deciding Game 5. However, the Mets would narrowly prevail as deGrom and closer Jeurys Familia helped keep the Dodgers' offense at bay after the first inning.

American League Championship Series

(1) Kansas City Royals vs. (2) Toronto Blue Jays 

This was a rematch of the 1985 ALCS, which the Royals won in seven games after trailing 3-1 in the series. On the 30th anniversary of their previous postseason meeting, the Royals again defeated the Blue Jays, this time in six games, to advance to the World Series for the second year in a row.

In Kansas City, the Royals controlled the first two games - they prevailed in a 6-0 shutout in Game 1, and scored six runs again in Game 2 to go up 2-0 in the series headed to Toronto. Game 3 was an offensive duel which the Blue Jays won 11-8 to avoid a sweep. In Game 4, the Royals routed the Blue Jays in a 14-2 blowout to go up 3-1 in the series. While the Blue Jays blew out the Royals, 7-1, in Game 5 to send the series back to Kansas City, the Royals closed out the series with a 4-3 win in Game 6 to secure the pennant.

As of 2022, this is the last time the Royals won the AL pennant. The Blue Jays returned to the ALCS the next year, but fell to the Cleveland Indians in five games.

National League Championship Series

(3) New York Mets vs. (5) Chicago Cubs 

The Mets swept the Cubs to return to the World Series for the first time since 2000. 

The Mets took Game 1 thanks to a solid pitching performance from Matt Harvey. In Game 2, Noah Syndergaard and the Mets' bullpen held the Cubs to just one run to take a 2-0 series lead headed to Chicago. In Game 3, the Cubs tied the game in the bottom of the fourth, however the Mets scored three unanswered runs in the sixth and seventh innings to win and take a 3-0 series lead. In Game 4, the Mets jumped out to a big lead early and did not relinquish it, clinching the pennant.

By coincidence, the Cubs' 2015 season ended on the same day as the 2015 World Series that was depicted in Back to the Future Part II. In the film, the Cubs swept a fictitious Miami team. However, the prediction in Back to the Future Part II was only off by one year, as the Cubs went on to win the 2016 World Series against the Cleveland Indians in seven games.

As of 2023, this is the last time the Mets won the NL pennant.

2015 World Series

(AL1) Kansas City Royals vs. (NL3) New York Mets 

This was the first World Series to feature two expansion teams - the Mets were the first expansion team to win the World Series overall in 1969, while the Royals became the first American League expansion team to win the World Series, doing so in 1985. The Royals defeated the Mets in five games to win their first World Series title since 1985.

In Game 1, the Mets held a 4-3 lead in the bottom of the ninth, however the Royals' Alex Gordon hit a solo home run to tie the game, handing New York's Jeurys Familia his first blown save in six postseason opportunities. Eric Hosmer won Game 1 for the Royals in the bottom of the fourteenth with a sacrifice fly. In Game 2, the Royals blew out the Mets thanks to a complete game performance from Johnny Cueto to go up 2-0 in the series headed to Queens. In Game 3, the Mets blew out the Royals by a 9-3 score thanks to a solid pitching performance by Noah Syndergaard to avoid a sweep. However, the Royals would take Game 4 by a 5-3 score to go up 3-1 in the series. In Game 5, New York's Matt Harvey helped keep the Royals' offense at bay and maintained a 2-0 lead for the Mets going into the bottom of the ninth. However, the Royals' Eric Hosmer cut the Mets lead to one with an RBI double which scored Lorenzo Cain, which prompted Mets manager Terry Collins to relive Harvey with Jeurys Familia. This decision proved to be fatal for the Mets, as Familia had yet another blown save as Hosmer stole home plate to tie the game. The game went scoreless throughout the tenth and eleventh innings, until the Royals broke the game open in the top of the twelfth, scoring five runs to take the lead for good, effectively securing the title. This was the second time in a row that the Mets lost the World Series at their home stadium (2000). 

As of 2023, this is the last postseason appearance by the Royals franchise, as well as the last postseason appearance outside of the Wild Card round for the Mets. It is also the most recent World Series appearance for the Mets, and was the only World Series appearance by a team from New York City during the 2010’s decade.

References

External links
 League Baseball Standings & Expanded Standings - 2015

 
Major League Baseball postseason